Keter Group, formerly Keter Plastic, is an Israeli manufacturer and marketer of resin-based household and garden consumer products. The company, established in 1948, has a chain of retail stores throughout Israel and operates 29 plants in Israel, Luxembourg, Europe, Canada and the United States. Keter products are marketed worldwide.

History
The Keter brand evolved from a small workshop established in Jaffa in 1948, specializing in the production of Resin combs, toys and housewares. In 1971, Joseph Sagol bought out his partners' shares in the workshop. Sagol later handed the management of the company over to his sons, Sami and Itzhak.

Since 1978, Keter has expanded its home product lines to include garden sheds, toolboxes, bathroom cabinets, backyard playhouses for children, and more – all made of resin.

In 1991, Keter acquired competitor L.M. Lipski.

In 2005 Keter acquired Curver international

In June 2013, Keter was one of several companies subjected to a boycott by the United Church of Canada and the Presbyterian Church (USA) because it had a factory in the Barkan Industrial Park.

In 2016, the private equity firm BC Partners purchased 80% of Keter for 1.4 billion euros. In 2021, Keter partnered with UBQ Materials to produce sustainable home and garden goods at scale.

In September 2021, Keter Plastic announced plans for an IPO on the New York Stock Exchange and filed a draft prospectus with the US Securities and Exchange Commission. Among the underwriters for the offering are Goldman Sachs, Jefferies, JP Morgan, and Bank of America.

Products

Keter manufactures household and garden products, cabinets, and outdoor furniture, especially the monobloc chair. It is one of Israel's largest manufacturers of resin-based outdoor and garden furniture.

In 2021, Keter partnered with UBQ Materials to increase the use of recycled content in their products to 55% by 2025.

See also
Economy of Israel

References

Plastics companies of Israel
Manufacturing companies established in 1948
1948 establishments in Israel
Mergers and acquisitions of Israeli companies